Tyrina is a subtribe of rove beetles.

Genera
 Abascantodes
 Agatyrus
 Anagonus
 Anitra
 Caledonogonus
 Cedius
 Chalcoplectus
 Chasoke
 Collacerothorax
 Dayao
 Durbos
 Gerallus
 Hamotulus
 Kiera
 Labomimus
 Linan
 Megatyrus
 Mipselytrus
 Narrabeen
 Pakistatyrus
 Palimbolus
 Paranagonus
 Phormiobius
 Plesiotyrus
 Pselaphodes
 Rytus
 Spilorhombus
 Taiwanophodes
 Tasmanityrus
 Tyromacrus
 Tyrogetus
 Tyromorphus
 Tyrus
 Vadoniotus
 Zeatyrus

References

External links
Wikispecies entry

Insect subtribes
Pselaphitae